Cuba has an embassy in Athens and Greece has an embassy in Havana. Greek positions on matters concerning Cuba are elaborated jointly with other European Union members.

History

There are between 30 and 50 people of Greek descent in Cuba. They are located mostly in Havana, where there is a Greek embassy. In 2004, Cuba built its first church in 43 years, the St. Nikolaos Greek Orthodox Church in Old Havana. It serves Havana's estimated 8,000 Orthodox Christians, 50 of whom are Greek.  Cuba's first Greek Orthodox church, Saints Constantine and Helen, was built in 1950 but was never used for church services.  As of 2004, it remained the home of a children's theater company, despite diplomatic efforts by Giorgos Kostoulas, Greece's ambassador to Cuba, to return the church to its original purpose.

See also 
 Foreign relations of Cuba
 Foreign relations of Greece

References

External links 
 Greek Ministry of Foreign Affairs about the relation with Cuba

 

 
Greece
Cuba